RK Gladijatori Derventa is a Bosnian rugby club based in Derventa. As of 2013 they are the only rugby team in Republika Srpska.

External links
RK Gladijatori Derventa (in Bosnian)

Bosnia and Herzegovina rugby union teams